This is a list of episodes for the anime adaptation of Elemental Gelade. The action adventure series is directed by Shigeru Ueda and produced by the Japanese animation studio Xebec. Twenty-six episodes were produced and originally broadcast on TV Tokyo between 5 April 2005 to 27 September 2005 at 6 pm. The episodes are based on the Elemental Gelade manga series created by Mayumi Azuma. It revolves around the adventures of a young sky pirate named Coud Van Giruet, an Edel Raid named Reverie Metherlence, and three members of an Edel Raid Complete Protection Agency named Cisqua, Rowen, and Kuea as they journey to the land of gold, Edel Garden.

The series is licensed in North America by Geneon Entertainment. Six DVD volumes were released bi-monthly from June 2006 to April 2007 containing four to five episodes each. An English airing appeared on the American television network ImaginAsian TV as part of their animation block "Anime EnerG". It was first aired in Japanese with English subtitles beginning on 30 January 2007 and later aired with English dubs. The series also first aired on January 3, 2009 on the Jetix Family Channel.

Episode list

See also
 List of Elemental Gelade characters

References

Episodes
Elemental Gelade